Shalbourne is a village and civil parish in the English county of Wiltshire, about  southwest of Hungerford, Berkshire. The parish has a number of widely spaced small settlements including Bagshot and Stype, to the north, and Rivar and Oxenwood to the south. Before 1895, about half of the parish of Shalbourne (including its church) lay in Berkshire.

History 

Domesday Book of 1086 recorded a settlement of 48 households at Saldeborne or Scaldeburne.

Under the Counties (Detached Parts) Act 1844, Oxenwood tithing was transferred from Berkshire to Wiltshire. Bagshot tithing was transferred in 1895, to complete the consolidation of the parish within Wiltshire.

Parish church 
The Anglican Church of St Michael and All Angels is Grade II* listed. Built in flint and stone with tiled roofs, it dates from the 12th or 13th century and was partly rebuilt and extended by G.F. Bodley in 1873.

The nave is either 12th century or a 13th-century rebuilding; reconstruction of the south aisle in the 19th century reused two 12th-century doorways. The chancel was rebuilt around 1300, and the tower added in the 15th century.

Three of the six bells in the tower are from the 17th century. The east chancel window has 1871 stained glass by Kempe. A window by Henry Haig was added in 1995, from designs of Karl Parsons, who lived at Shalbourne from 1930 until the onset of ill health in 1933.

The benefice was united with that of Ham with Buttermere in 1956. Today the parish is part of the Savernake Team, a group of eleven village parishes.

Other buildings 
Also Grade II* listed are West Court farmhouse (15th and 17th centuries) and Shalbourne Manor farmhouse (16th century).

Geography 
The Shalbourne Stream flows northeast from its spring-fed source near Shalbourne village, to join the River Dun above Hungerford.

Local government
The civil parish elects a parish council. It is in the area of Wiltshire Council unitary authority, which is responsible for all significant local government functions.

Amenities
Shalbourne has a primary school and a village hall which was built in 1843 as a schoolroom.

Notable people
Alexander Chocke of Shalbourne (1594–1625) was elected to Parliament for Ludgershall in 1621.
 From 1608 until late 1637, tenants of the parish's Westcourt Manor included William Carpenter and his namesake son, both of whom emigrated to Weymouth, Massachusetts in 1638 on the Bevis from Southampton. The younger William was a founder of Rehoboth, Massachusetts. The Rehoboth Carpenter family's descendants number in the tens of thousands, among whom are two U.S. presidents and a Project Mercury astronaut. William Carpenter [Jr.] married at Shalbourne in 1625 Abigail Briant, whose family had resided in the parish since at least the late 16th century.
Jethro Tull (1674–1741), agricultural pioneer, from 1709 owned Prosperous farm, close to the northeast boundary of the present parish.
Marguerite de Beaumont (1899-1989) founding member of Girl Guides, biographer of Lord Baden-Powell, recipient of the Silver Fish Award, Girl Guiding's highest adult honour.

See also
 Botley Down, a biological Site of Special Scientific Interest near Oxenwood

References

External links

 
 Shalbourne village website

Villages in Wiltshire
Civil parishes in Wiltshire